Viji Thampi is an Indian film director, actor and social activist who works in Malayalam films. Thampi is a member of Thiruvananthapuram regional board of the Central Board of Film Certification and the State Advisor of Kerala Kshetra Samrakshana Samithi. In 2021, Thampi was appointed as the Kerala state president of Vishva Hindu Parishad.

Career
After making his directorial debut with the 1988 film David David Mr. David, Thampi directed a series of comedy films in the 1990s which turned out to be commercial hits.
Viji Thampi is known for appearing in cameo roles in his own films. He has also directed the Malayalam crime thriller television series Black and White and later, the mythological television serial Devimahathmyam.

Personal life
He is the son in law of the Malayalam movie actor Jagannatha Varma. He lives in Palkulangara Trivandrum.

Filmography

Director

Actor 
 Ennalum Sarath (2018) Dir.: Balachandra Menon 
 Njaan Samvidhanam Cheyyum (2016) Dir.: Balachandra Menon
 Thanthonni (2010)... as Landlord (benaami)
 Pachakuthira (2006)... Himself
 Bada Dosth (2006)... Sekhara Pilla
 Krithyam (2005)... Lawrence
 Vakkalathu Narayanankutty (2001)... Chief Minister
 Satyamev Jayate (2000)... Man at the bar
 Samaantharangal (1998)... Mathew
 Anuragakottaram (1998)...Punjabi Singh
 Avittam Thirunaal Aarogya Sriman (1995)... Arumukham Thampi
 Simhavalan Menon... Ikka
 Pidakkozhi Koovunna Noottandu (1994)... Store room operator
 Soorya Manasam (1992)... Landlord
 Thiruthalvaadi (1992)... Avtar Singh
 Nagarangalil Chennu Raparkam (1989)... Taxi driver
 Pavam Pavam Rajakumaran(1990) as Bank Officer
 Nagarathil Samsara Vishayam (1991)... Himself
 Unnikale Oru Kadha Parayam (1987)... Police
 Achuvettante Veedu (1987)... Taxi driver

Television serials
 Director

2019– Ayyappa Saranam (Amrita TV)
2010–2012 – Devimahathmyam (Asianet)
2007– Mahatma Gandhi Colony (Asianet)
2008– Sree Krishna Leela (Asianet)
2005– Amma (Tele-cinema Amrita)
2004– Annie (Tele-cinema Kairaly)
2000– Black & White (Asianet)
As ActorMaskVamsam As JudgeShreshtabharatam- Mahabharata'' (Amrita TV)

References

External links 
 
 Viji Thampi: Withstanding The Test Of Time
Website http://vijitampi.com/

Malayalam film directors
Living people
Male actors from Thiruvananthapuram
Male actors in Malayalam cinema
Year of birth missing (living people)
Indian male film actors
20th-century Indian male actors
21st-century Indian male actors
20th-century Indian film directors
21st-century Indian film directors
Film directors from Thiruvananthapuram
Screenwriters from Thiruvananthapuram
Malayalam screenwriters